Jamaica is the central village and a census-designated place (CDP) in the town of Jamaica, Windham County, Vermont, United States. As of the 2020 census, it had a population of 174, compared to 1,005 in the entire town.

The CDP is in northwestern Windham County, in the center of the town of Jamaica. It sits on the eastern side of the Green Mountains in the valley of Ball Mountain Brook where it joins the West River, a southeast-flowing tributary of the Connecticut River. Jamaica State Park is on the West River on the northern edge of the village.  Ball Mountain rises to the north over the West River, while  College Hill rises to the west.

Vermont Routes 30 and 100 pass through the center of Jamaica together. Route 30 leads northwest over the Green Mountains  to Manchester Center and southeast down the West River valley  to Brattleboro, while Route 100 leads north  to Londonderry and south  to Wilmington.

References 

Populated places in Windham County, Vermont
Census-designated places in Windham County, Vermont
Census-designated places in Vermont